Ganga Nagar is a neighbourhood in the northeast part of Meerut, Uttar Pradesh. This neighbourhood was named after the Ganges river.

It is surrounded by the Defence colony and Awho colony Meerut cantt to the south, Buxar village to the north, and Abdullahpur to the east.

Education 
It is home to educational institutes such as IIMT University, The Avenue Public School, International Public school, and Gargi girls school, while also being close to JP Hotel management college, Forte Institute and Translam Academy.

Economy 
Branches of banks such as State Bank of India, Punjab National Bank, UCO Bank, ICICI Bank, Syndicate Bank and Axis Bank, along with the UP West Regional Office of Airtel and BSNL. Super Market Retail Chains like Vishal Mega mart, Easy Day are also here.

References 

Meerut district